Aziz Motazedi (born August 10, 1950, in Tehran, Iran) is an Iranian novelist and essayist. He has lived in Montreal, Quebec, Canada, since 1995. Motazedi has also written critical articles on politics as well as the literary and intellectual discourses of his original country and elsewhere. His novel Scheherazade was subject to an official ban with a possibility to be published after heavy censorship by the Ministry of Culture and Islamic Guidance, and it was finally published, in full,  with several years delay in Toronto, Ontario, Canada.

See also
Censorship in Iran

References

1950 births
Living people
Iranian male novelists
Iranian novelists
Iranian male short story writers
Iranian journalists
Journalists from Montreal
People from Tehran
Iranian emigrants to Canada
Writers from Montreal